Chancery Hill Historic District is a national historic district located at Morgantown, Monongalia County, West Virginia. The district originally included 109 contributing buildings and 1 contributing site, Oak Grove Cemetery.  A boundary increase in 2001, added the already listed Alexander Wade House to the district.  The district encompasses a residential area developed in the early-20th century on property that was once the farm of U.S. Senator Waitman T. Willey.  It includes examples of popular architectural styles from that period including Queen Anne, American Foursquare, Colonial Revival, and Bungalow.

It was listed on the National Register of Historic Places in 1999, with a boundary increase in 2001.

Oak Grove Cemetery
Notable burials include:
 William E. Glasscock, 13th Governor of West Virginia
 John Hagans, member of the United States House of Representatives from 1873 to 1875
 George Cookman Sturgiss, member of the United States House of Representatives from 1907 to 1911
 Waitman T. Willey, member of the Wheeling Convention, Senator for Virginia and West Virginia
 Edgar C. Wilson, member of the United States House of Representatives from 1833 to 1835 for Virginia
 Thomas Wilson, member of the United States House of Representatives from 1811 to 1813 for Virginia

References

External links

 

American Foursquare architecture in West Virginia
Buildings and structures in Morgantown, West Virginia
Bungalow architecture in West Virginia
Cemeteries on the National Register of Historic Places in West Virginia
Colonial Revival architecture in West Virginia
Historic districts in Monongalia County, West Virginia
Houses on the National Register of Historic Places in West Virginia
National Register of Historic Places in Monongalia County, West Virginia
Queen Anne architecture in West Virginia
Houses in Monongalia County, West Virginia
Historic districts on the National Register of Historic Places in West Virginia
Rural cemeteries